Mārahau is a village in the Tasman District of the South Island of New Zealand, approximately  north of Motueka. Its location on Tasman Bay and at the southern entrance of the Abel Tasman National Park makes it a popular holiday destination for those keen on outdoor activities. People access the Abel Tasman from Mārahau by tramping, kayaking and water taxi. In Mārahau itself, the beach offers sheltered and safe swimming, and horse trekking is popular throughout the busy summer season.

The Mārahau community has adopted their own flag, named , designed by local artist Tim Wraight in 2012.

Demographics

It had a population of 231 at the 2018 New Zealand census, an increase of 33 people (16.7%) since the 2013 census, and an increase of 45 people (24.2%) since the 2006 census. There were 78 households comprising 120 males and 111 females, giving a sex ratio of 1.08 males per female. The median age was 50.3 years (compared with 37.4 years nationally), with 27 people (11.7%) aged under 15 years, 30 (13.0%) aged 15 to 29, 129 (55.8%) aged 30 to 64, and 45 (19.5%) aged 65 or older.

Ethnicities were 97.4% European/Pākehā, 5.2% Māori, 1.3% Pacific peoples, 1.3% Asian, and 1.3% other ethnicities; the reason that these figures add up to more than 100% is that people could identify with multiple ethnicities.

Of those people who chose to answer the census's question about religious affiliation, 66.2% had no religion, 22.1% were Christian, 1.3% were Buddhist and 3.9% had other religions.

Of those at least 15 years old, 54 (26.5%) people had a bachelor's or higher degree, and 27 (13.2%) people had no formal qualifications. The median income was $28,100, compared with $31,800 nationally. The employment status of those at least 15 was that 90 (44.1%) people were employed full-time, 57 (27.9%) were part-time, and 6 (2.9%) were unemployed.

Mārahau is part of the Kaiteriteri-Riwaka SA2 statistical area.

References

External links
 Tourism New Zealand

Populated places in the Tasman District
Populated places around Tasman Bay / Te Tai-o-Aorere